Jacob Barrett Laursen (born 17 November 1994) is a Danish professional footballer who plays as a left-back for Belgian club Standard Liège.

Club career
Juventus signed Laursen in 2012 for €1 million from Aalborg BK. After spending one season in Juventus Primavera team, Laursen joined Danish side OB on loan for the 2013–14 season. He made his competitive debut at 10 November 2013 in a 3–1 home defeat against FC Vestsjælland. He appeared as a 65th-minute substitute.

On 3 July 2014, Laursen joined Odense Boldklub permanently, signing three-year deal.

In June 2020, it was announced Laursen would join Arminia Bielefeld, newly promoted to the Bundesliga, on a three-year contract.

On 23 July 2022, Laursen moved to Standard Liège in Belgium with a contract for three years with an option for a fourth year.

References

External links

 Official Danish Superliga stats

Living people
1994 births
Association football defenders
Danish men's footballers
Denmark under-21 international footballers
Denmark youth international footballers
Juventus F.C. players
Odense Boldklub players
Arminia Bielefeld players
Standard Liège players
Danish Superliga players
Bundesliga players
2. Bundesliga players
Footballers at the 2016 Summer Olympics
Olympic footballers of Denmark
Danish expatriate men's footballers
Expatriate footballers in Italy
Danish expatriate sportspeople in Italy
Expatriate footballers in Germany
Danish expatriate sportspeople in Germany
Expatriate footballers in Belgium
Danish expatriate sportspeople in Belgium